The Roland Fountain (sometimes referred to as Maximilian Fountain;  or Maximiliánova fontána) is the most famous fountain in Bratislava, Slovakia, as well as one of the city's important landmarks. It is located in the Old Town, in the Main Square.

Its construction was ordered by Maximilian II, the king of Royal Hungary, in 1572 to provide a public water supply. The fountain is topped by a statue of Maximilian portrayed as a knight in full armour sculpted by master A. Lutringer. Its current appearance is probably far from its original look, since it has been modified and rebuilt several times. However its popularity remains unaltered, still being one of the downtown's favorite meeting points. Many legends are centred on this fountain, mostly featuring Maximilian as the town's protector.

See also 
 List of fountains in Bratislava

Buildings and structures in Bratislava
Fountains in Slovakia
Tourist attractions in Bratislava